The Campeonato Nacional Fútbol Femenino, is the main league competition for women's football in Chile. The winner qualifies for the Copa Libertadores de Fútbol Femenino, the South American Champions League. The competition is organised by the Chilean Football Federation.

Since 2008, the league has been turned to semi-professionalism in order to improve women's football standard in the competition, with the name change and the establishment of a part-time fund for the team. In March 2022, the league will turn to full-time professional, ending a decade of semi-professional status of Chilean female players, starting from 2023 season.

Format 
The Apertura and Clausura format is used, thus there are two champions per year. Apertura starts early in the year, Clausura starts mid year and ends in December. As of 2013 about 20 teams play in two divisions, a Southern one and a Central one. They play a single round-robin tournament. After that the top four teams advance to the quarter-finals. Since 2014 the final is played in only one match, as the other knock-out matches, before that the final was two-legged. If different teams win the Apertura and Clausura there is a play-off for the Copa Libertadores spot.

2022 Teams

List of champions 

Below is the list of champions. In 2011 an Apertura and Clausura format was introduced.

Titles before 2008 were unofficial(?), as Universidad de Chile is credited with the first title in 2016.
 1999: Universidad de Chile
 2000: Universidad de Chile
 2001: Universidad de Chile
 2002: Santiago Morning
 2005: Universidad de Chile

Titles by club

References

External links 
 ANFP; Federation website's women's football portal

Women
Chile
Women's football in Chile
Women's sports leagues in Chile